, abbreviated as , is a private university in Setagaya, Tokyo and Aoba-ku, Yokohama. The precursor of the school was founded in 1893, and it was chartered as a university in 1949. The school is known for the many famous athletes among its alumni.

Organization

Schools and Faculties
Faculty of Sport Science
Department of Physical Education
Department of Health Science
Department of Martial Arts
Department of Lifelong Sports and Recreation
School of Childhood Sport Education
Department of Childhood Sport Education
Faculty of Medical Science
Department of Judo Therapy and Medical Science
Department of Emergency Medical Science.

Graduate Schools
Master's and Doctoral Degree Programs, Graduate School of Health and Sport Science

Research Centers
Comprehensive Sport Science Research Center
The Comprehensive Sport Science Research Center publishes the open access journal, "NSSU Journal of Sport Sciences".
Research Institute for Sport Science: RISS
Sports Training Center

University Library
The library of the Setagaya campus holds some 380,000 books.

Other Organizations
Office of Athletics
Student Support Center
Admission Center
Health Care Center
Student Dormitory

Notable alumni

Athletes
Nobuyuki Aihara - Gymnast; Olympic gold medalist
Yutaka Aihara - Gymnast; Olympic bronze medalist
Toshiko Shirasu-Aihara - Gymnast; Olympic bronze medalist
Yuko Arimori - Marathon runner; Olympic silver medalist
Hokutōfuji Daiki - Professional sumo wrestler
Takeshita Konosuke - Professional wrestler
Kōji Gushiken - Gymnast; Olympic gold medalist
Chiyotairyū Hidemasa - Professional sumo wrestler
Yukio Iketani - Gymnast; Olympic silver medalist
Keiko Tanaka-Ikeda - Gymnast; Olympic gold medalist
Nahomi Kawasumi - Football player; Olympic silver medalist
Kosuke Kitajima - Swimmer; Olympic gold medalist
Eizo Kenmotsu - Gymnast; Olympic gold, silver and bronze medalist
Mako Kobata - Volleyball player; a part of 2020 Summer Olympics women's tournament
Toshihiko Koga - Retired judoka; Olympic gold medalist
Yoshikaze Masatsugu - Professional sumo wrestler
Karina Maruyama - Football player; Olympic silver medalist
Kentaro Minagawa - Alpine skier
Daisuke Miyazaki - Handball player
Shinji Morisue - Gymnast; Olympic gold medalist
Jungo Morita -  Volleyball player; Olympic gold medalist
Mari Motohashi - Curler
Katsuhiko Nagata - Amateur wrestler; Olympic silver medalist
Chieko Sugawara - Fencer
Juri Takayama - Softball player; Olympic silver medalist
Rie Tanaka - Gymnast
Kakizoe Tōru - Professional sumo wrestler
Mitsuo Tsukahara - Gymnast; Olympic gold medalist
Kōhei Uchimura - Active gymnast; Olympic gold and silver medalist
Yayoi Urano - Amateur wrestler; 6-time world champion
Haruhiro Yamashita - Gymnast; Olympic gold medalist
Kōji Yamamuro - Gymnast; Olympic silver medalist
Hiroshi Yamamoto - Archer; Olympic silver medalist
Toshiki Yamamoto - Weightlifter
Myōgiryū Yasunari - Professional sumo wrestler
Tomohiro Yamamoto – Volleyball player; a part of 2020 Summer Olympics men's tournament
Kenta Takanashi – Volleyball player; a part of 2020 Summer Olympics men's tournament
Ran Takahashi – Volleyball player; a part of 2020 Summer Olympics men's tournament
Yuki Tsunoda - Formula 1 driver

Politicians
Ryoko Tani - Retired judoka; Olympic gold medalist
Kazuyuki Nakane - Member of the House of Representatives in the Diet of Japan.
Kenshiro Matsunami - Member of the House of Representatives in the Diet of Japan.

Entertainers
Sonny Chiba - Actor; Martial artist
Yota Tsuji - Professional wrestler
Keita Machida - Actor
Mandy Sekiguchi - Dancer

Current notable students

Athletes 
Uta Abe - Active Judoka; 2020 Olympic gold medalist and two-times world champion of -52 kg category.
Hifumi Abe - Active Judoka; 2020 Olympic gold medalist and two-times world champion of -66 kg category.
Kenzō Shirai - Active gymnast; 2016 Olympic gold and bronze medalist
Ran Takahashi - Active Volleyball Player; part of Japan's national team competing in the 2020 Tokyo Olympics volleyball men's tournament
Daiki Kajiwara - Active para badminton Player; 2020 Paralympic gold medalist of men's singles WH2 and bronze medalist of men's doubles WH1–WH2

Notes

External links 

 
 University Library Official Website

 
Private universities and colleges in Japan
Educational institutions established in 1893
Universities and colleges in Yokohama
1893 establishments in Japan
Sports universities and colleges
American football in Japan
Kantoh Collegiate American Football Association Top 8 university